is the name of two invasions of Iga province by the Oda clan during the Sengoku period. The province was conquered by Oda Nobunaga in 1581 after an unsuccessful attempt in 1579 by his son Oda Nobukatsu. The names of the wars are derived from the Tenshō era name (1573–1592) in which they occurred.

Background
Geographically, the Iga region was surrounded by mountains on all sides that could be passed through only via narrow pathways. This, plus the distance of the region from major transportation routes, meant that Iga was easily defendable by a relatively small number of men and was not a priority target for outside forces. 
The Niki clan had served as shugo of the province for the Ashikaga shogunate, but their control had never been strong and soon weakened further as the shōgun's authority diminished. No great warlord rose to take their place, although the Rokkaku to the north and the Kitabatake to the east extended their influence over parts of the province. Instead, as also happened in some neighboring areas, the province came to be controlled by a league (ikki) of the numerous local warrior clans (jizamurai) which had formed to defend the area's independence from outside military forces.

Following the Battle of Okehazama in 1560, Oda Nobunaga of Owari province began his rise as a prominent daimyō of central Japan, rapidly expanding his territory. In 1567 he began his invasion of Ise province, which was then largely under the control of the Kitabatake clan. He slowly caused the Kitabatake vassals to switch to his side, and forced Kitabatake Tomofusa, the head of the clan, to sue for peace following the Battle of Okawachi Castle in 1569. As part of the peace agreement, Tomofusa adopted Nobunaga's son Nobukatsu as his heir, ceding much of his authority to the Oda. In December 1576 Nobunaga and Nobukatsu assassinated most of the remaining Kitabatake leadership (the Mise Incident), cementing their control of Ise.

First Tenshō Iga War (1579)

The young Nobukatsu, who now had control over Ise, decided to expand his domain to include Iga as well. In March 1578, Kai Shimoyama, a former minor Kitabatake vassal from Iga, visited Nobukatsu at his residence in Matsugashima and urged him to invade Iga, listing misdeeds being committed there. These included the expulsion of Niki Yubai, the nominal shugo of Iga, in June of the previous year. Tempted at the possibility of adding Iga to his domain, Nobukatsu dispatched Takigawa Kazumasu to build a castle at Maruyama in Iga to serve as a staging point for the campaign.

Alerted of Nobukatsu's intentions by the construction of the castle, warriors from Iga decided to attack before it had been completed. They attacked Maruyama Castle in broad daylight on November 24, 1578. Taken completely by surprise, Takigawa was forced to withdraw from the castle, which the Iga forces then burned. He reassembled the remnants of his forces at nearby Tsuzumigamine but was again defeated and retreated back to Ise.

Embarrassed and angered by this setback, Nobukatsu wanted to immediately attack Iga but was persuaded to wait by his advisors. Still determined to attack a year later, he formulated a three-pronged invasion the following year and departed Matsugashima on October 6, 1579. The Iga forces soon learned of Nobukatsu's preparations, however, and made plans to meet him. Nobukatsu and his main force of 8,000 men entered Iga through Nagano Pass the following day, but were ambushed as they did so. The waiting Iga troops made heavy use of their knowledge of the terrain and guerrilla tactics to surprise and confuse Nobukatsu's army. He retreated, taking heavy losses as his army became disorganized. The two other, smaller forces (1,500 men led by Tsuge Saburō through Onikobu Pass and 1,300 men led by Nagano Sakyōnosuke through Aoyama Pass) met similar fates, with Tsuge losing his life. According to the Iranki, Nobukatsu's losses numbered in the thousands.

The campaign was thus a disaster; not only was Nobukatsu defeated, he had also lost one of his generals. Moreover, Nobukatsu had not consulted with Nobunaga prior to launching his attack. Nobukatsu's attack had been partly motivated by a desire to prove his merit to his father. Instead, Nobunaga was furious when he learned of his actions and threatened to disown him.

Second Tenshō Iga War (1581)

On September 30, 1581, Nobunaga launched his own invasion of Iga on a much larger scale. The immediate trigger for this second invasion was a visit by two residents of Iga to Nobunaga's stronghold in Azuchi a month before, during which the men offered to serve as guides for an invasion of the province. Nobunaga agreed and rewarded the men.

By this time Oda Nobunaga was at the height of his power. He controlled most of central Japan, including all of the territories that bordered Iga. He was therefore able to assemble a large army which attacked the province from all directions:

12,000 men under Niwa Nagahide and Takigawa Kazumasu entering from Tsuge to the northeast.
10,000 men under the command of Nobukatsu and Tsuda Nobusumi entering from Ise (Aoyama Pass) to the southeast.
7,000 men under Gamō Ujisato and Wakisaka Yasuharu entering from Tamataki to the north.
7,000 men under Asano Nagamasa entering from Hase to the southwest.
3,700 men under Tsutsui Junkei entering from Kasama to the southwest.
2,300 men under Hori Hidemasa entering from Tarao to the northwest.

Against this large army of 42,000 men, the Iga defenders only totaled 10,000 at most, and these were spread throughout the province. The Oda forces advanced, torching castles, shrines, and temples, and meeting relatively little resistance. The most significant military actions were the siege of Hijiyama Castle, which had become the rallying point for the northern Iga forces, and the siege of Kashiwara Castle in the south. With the surrender of the forces in Kashiwara Castle on October 8, organized Iga resistance came to an end.

Oda Nobunaga himself toured the conquered province in early November 1581, and then withdrew his troops, placing control in Nobukatsu's hands.

Impact
The espionage and guerrilla tactics developed by the Iga "militias of warrior-peasants" are believed to have formed the basis for the "ninja" tradition of the region. Following their defeat, forces from Iga were hired as auxiliary troops by other military forces.

See also
Mumon: The Land of Stealth

Notes

References
Kikuoka Nyogen (1879). Iranki (Records of the Iga Wars), edited by Momochi Orinosuke. Tekisui Shoin.
Nishigaki Seiji, Matsushima Hiroshi (1975). Mie-ken no Rekishi (History of Mie Prefecture). Yamakawa.
Ōta Gyūichi (2011). The Chronicle of Lord Nobunaga, translated by J.S.A. Elisonas and J.P. Lamers. Brill.
Rekishi Gunzō, No. 20 (1990). 
Souyri, Pierre (2010). "Autonomy and War in the Sixteenth-Century Iga Region and the Birth of the Ninja Phenomenon", in War and State Building in Medieval Japan, edited by John A. Ferejohn and Frances McCall Rosenbluth. Stanford University Press.

External links

Military history of feudal Japan
16th century in Japan
Battles of the Sengoku period
1570s conflicts
1580s conflicts